The NHS Centre for Integrative Care, formerly the Glasgow Homeopathic Hospital, is an NHS treatment centre specialising in holistic treatments, including the use of homeopathy, on the Gartnavel Hospital campus in Glasgow. It is managed by NHS Greater Glasgow and Clyde.

History 
The hospital has its origins in a small facility located at Berkeley Street which was funded by the Houldsworth family and opened as the Houldsworth Homeopathic Dispensary in March 1909. It moved to 5 Lynedoch Crescent in May 1914 and then to a substantial villa in Great Western Road in 1931 before joining the National Health Service as the Glasgow Homeopathic Hospital in 1948.

It moved to the Gartnavel Hospital campus in 1999 and became the NHS Centre for Integrative Care in 2014.

Proposed closure 
There have been prolonged efforts to de-fund homeopathic treatments within the NHS. , NHS Lanarkshire, NHS Highland and NHS Lothian had ceased to make referrals to the centre. NHS Greater Glasgow and Clyde has proposed that the centre may be reassigned to become a new centre for the treatment of chronic pain. Plans to close the unit were put forward by Greater Glasgow and Clyde Health Board in 2017. , the Centre for Integrative Care was still operating, with an annual budget of £1.7M. 

 NHS Greater Glasgow and Clyde continues to mention homeopathic treatments on its website.

References 

NHS Scotland hospitals
Hospitals in Glasgow
Homeopathic hospitals in the United Kingdom
NHS Greater Glasgow and Clyde